

The , more commonly known in the West as the Real World Tag League, is an annual professional wrestling tournament held by All Japan Pro Wrestling since 1977, usually, run on the first weeks of December. The first tournament was actually called the Open Tag League, but it was renamed to its present name the following year.

The tournament is held under round-robin rules, with 2 points for a win, 1 for a draw, and 0 for a loss; in earlier tournaments, only a time limit draw would provide the one point, with other methods (such as a Double Disqualification and Double Countouts) providing nothing for either team.

The name "Real World Tag League" was a mistranslation by AJPW promoter Giant Baba; "saikyō" in Japanese means "strongest," not "real", but Baba used Engrish for promotional material.

Between 1988 and 1994, the World Tag Team Championship was annually vacated in time for the tournament, which would be used to determine the new champions. The rule was reinstated for the 2012 tournament, but was again ignored the following year, but was reinstated in 2014. In 2000 and 2015 the vacancy was determined by separate post-tournament playoffs between the 2nd and 3rd places.

Ten-Koji (Hiroyoshi Tenzan & Satoshi Kojima) are the only team to win both the World's Strongest Tag Determination League and its counterpart in New Japan Pro-Wrestling, the World Tag League, as well as the only team to win both tournaments in the same year (2008).

Results

List of winners

1977
The 1977 Tag League, featuring 9 teams, was held from December 2 to December 15.

1978
The 1978 Tag League, featuring 6 teams, was held from December 1 to December 15. Abdullah the Butcher used both The Sheik and Tor Kamata as partners.

1979
The 1979 Tag League, featuring 7 teams, was held from November 30 to December 13.

1980
The 1980 Tag League, featuring 7 teams, was held from November 28 to December 11.

1981
The 1981 Tag League, featuring 9 teams, was held from November 27 to December 13. Winners Bruiser Brody and Jimmy Snuka were the first winners to never win the World Tag Team Championship or its predecessors the International or PWF titles, as Stan Hansen, who had recently jumped from New Japan Pro-Wrestling and helped Brody and Snuka win the final, became Brody's new regular tag team partner beginning the following year.

1982
The 1982 Tag League, featuring 7 teams, was held from November 26 to December 13.

1983
The 1983 Tag League, featuring 8 teams, was held from November 25 to December 12.

1984
The 1984 Tag League, featuring 8 teams, was held from November 22 to December 12.

1985
The 1985 Tag League, featuring 8 teams, was held from November 23 to December 12.

1986
The 1986 Tag League, featuring 9 teams, was held from November 22 to December 12.

1987
The 1987 Tag League, featuring 12 teams, was held from November 21 to December 11.

1988
The 1988 Tag League, featuring 11 teams, was held from November 19 to December 16. It was also to decide the vacant World Tag Team Championship.

1989
The 1989 Tag League, featuring 10 teams, was held from November 17 to December 6. It was also to decide the vacant World Tag Team Championship.

1990
The 1990 Tag League, featuring 12 teams, was held from November 15 to December 7. It was also to decide the vacant World Tag Team Championship.

1991
The 1991 Tag League, featuring 13 teams, was held from November 16 to December 6. It was also to decide the vacant World Tag Team Championship.

1992
The 1992 Tag League, featuring 11 teams, was held from November 14 to December 4. It was also to decide the vacant World Tag Team Championship.

1993
The 1993 Tag League, featuring 8 teams, was held from November 13 to December 2. It was also to decide the vacant World Tag Team Championship. Giant Baba replaced Ted DiBiase as Stan Hansen's partner after one match due to injury.

1Hansen and Ted DiBiase originally defeated Slinger & Smothers in 7:11; however, when Baba replaced DiBiase, the teams wrestled a rematch.

1994
The 1994 Tag League, featuring 10 teams, was held from November 19 to December 10. It was also to decide the vacant World Tag Team Championship.

1995
The 1995 Tag League, featuring 10 teams, was held from November 18 to December 9.

1996
The 1996 Tag League, featuring 7 teams, was held from November 16 to December 6. In an alteration of previous years, each team faced each other twice during the group stage.

1997
The 1997 Tag League, featuring 10 teams, was held from November 15 to December 5.

1998
The 1998 Tag League, featuring 8 teams, was held from November 14 to December 5.

1999
The 1999 Tag League, featuring 8 teams, was held from November 13 to December 3.

2000
The 2000 Tag League, featuring 8 teams, was held from November 19 to December 9. Due to a four-way tie for first place, the four teams were placed into a semifinals instead of the traditional one-match final.

2001
The 2001 Tag League, featuring 8 teams, was held from November 24 to December 7. As with the previous year, the top four teams faced off in the semifinals as a result of a four-way tie.

2002
The 2002 Tag League, featuring 8 teams, was held from November 23 to December 6.

2003
The 2003 Tag League, featuring 7 teams, was held from November 22 to December 2.

2004
The 2004 Tag League was held from November 21 to December 1. It was the first to utilize a multi-block system, featuring 10 teams in two blocks, with the winners of each block facing each other in the final.

2005
The 2005 Tag League, featuring 10 teams in two blocks, was held from November 20 to December 5.

2006
The 2006 Tag League, featuring 7 teams, was held from November 19 to December 2.

2007
The 2007 Tag League featured 8 teams and was held from November 23 to December 9.

2008
The 2008 league was held from November 22 to December 8 and featured 8 teams.

2009
The 2009 Tag League, featuring 9 teams, was held from November 23 to December 6.

2010
The 2010 Tag League, featuring 9 teams, was held from November 20 to December 7.

2011
The 2011 Tag League, featuring 9 teams, was held from November 19 to December 4.

2012
The 2012 Tag League was held from November 17 to November 30. It was only the second to utilize a multi-block system, featuring 10 teams in two blocks, with the winners of each block facing each other in the final, contested for the vacant World Tag Team Championship. Kenso and Great Sasuke were forced to pull out of the tournament and forfeit all of their matches after Sasuke suffered a shoulder injury.

2013
The 2013 Tag League, featuring 8 teams, will be held from November 30 to December 8. Bambi Killer was originally scheduled to take part in the tournament, but was forced to pull out due to a neck injury and was replaced by Kenso.

2014
The 2014 Tag League, featuring 8 teams, took place from November 16 to December 6. Atsushi Aoki and Hikaru Sato earned a spot in the tournament by winning the 2014 Jr. Tag Battle of Glory in October. The tournament was contested for the World Tag Team Championship, which Jun Akiyama and Takao Omori vacated on October 23 in time for the tournament.

2015
The 2015 World's Strongest Tag Determination League took place from November 23 to December 6. After their win, Suwama and Miyahara turned on each other.

2016
The 2016 edition of the World Strongest Tag Determination League took place from December 3 through December 18.

2017
The 2017 edition of the World Strongest Tag Determination League took place from November 19 through December 12.

2018
The 2018 edition of the World Strongest Tag Determination League took place from November 13 through December 11.

2019
The 2019 edition of the World Strongest Tag Determination League took place from November 11 through December 9.

2020
The 2020 edition of the World Strongest Tag Determination League, featured 8 teams in a single block, taking place from November 18 to December 7. The tournament featured outside participation from Big Japan Pro Wrestling's Daisuke Sekimoto & Abdullah Kobayashi and from Pro Wrestling Zero1's Masato Tanaka. On November 17, it was announced that Zeus had tested positive for coronavirus (COVID-19), leading him to pull out of the tournament and be replaced by his Purple Haze stablemate Izanagi.

2021
The 2021 edition of the World Strongest Tag Determination League, featured 16 teams in 4 blocks, taking place from November 13 to December 5.

2022
The 2022 edition of the World's Strongest Tag Determination League reverts back to the single-block format featuring 8 teams. The tournament takes place from November 13 to December 7. The tournament features outside participants from New Japan Pro-Wrestling's Yuji Nagata and Big Japan Pro Wrestling's Takuya Nomura. On November 25, it was announced that Shotaro Ashino would be absent for the remainder of the tournament, due to injury, leading to him and Ryuki Honda to forfeit the remainder of their matches.

References

External links
Tournament history at All-Japan.co.jp

All Japan Pro Wrestling tournaments
Tag team tournaments